Darwin Daniel Machís Marcano (born 7 February 1993) is a Venezuelan professional footballer who plays as a forward or winger for La Liga club Real Valladolid and the Venezuela national team.

Club career
Machís started his career with AC Mineros de Guayana, making his official debut on 21 August 2011, coming on as a substitute in a 1–1 away draw against Estudiantes de Mérida, for the Venezuelan Primera División championship. He scored his first professional goal ten days later, in a 5–1 home routing over Minasoro FC. Machís appeared regularly for the side, scoring 16 goals during the campaign (eight only in Copa Venezuela), and was awarded a prize from the Venezuelan Football Federation.

On 7 July 2012, Machís joined Udinese, but signed a five-year contract with fellow Giampaolo Pozzo's club Granada CF. He appeared in the pre-season with the latter, scoring three times in only five games.

Machís made his La Liga debut on 20 August 2012, as a late substitute in a 0–1 loss at Rayo Vallecano. He appeared in further three matches for the Andalusians, all from the bench.

On 31 January 2013, Machís moved to Vitória S.C. on loan until June. However, he appeared sparingly with the main squad, appearing with the reserves in the second level. He made two late substitute appearances in the 2012–13 Taça de Portugal semifinal matches, with Vitória eventually winning the Cup.

He returned to Granada in the 2013 summer, being assigned to the B-team in Segunda División B. On 8 May 2014, he joined Hércules CF in a month's loan.

On 6 August 2015, Machís moved to SD Huesca, in a season-long loan deal. Roughly one year later, he joined CD Leganés in the top tier, again in a temporary deal.

On 18 July 2018, Machís signed with Serie A side Udinese. The following 29 January, he returned to Spain and joined Cádiz CF on loan until 30 June.

On 28 July 2019, Machis signed back for the freshly promoted Granada CF after spending half a year on loan at Cádiz CF. He made his competitive debut on 17 August 2019, starting and scoring in a 4–4 draw against Villarreal. On 13 July 2020 he scored against Real Madrid in a 2–1 loss.

On 29 April 2021, Machís scored the equalizer against FC Barcelona. Granada would go on to win 2–1, in their first ever win at Camp Nou.

In January 2023, he joined Real Valladolid on a three-and-a-half-year contract.

International career
Machís debuted with the Venezuela national team on 22 December 2011, starting in a 2–0 loss against Costa Rica. He later appeared with the under-20s in 2013 South American Youth Championship.

Career statistics

Club

International 

Scores and results list Venezuela's goal tally first.

Honours
Mineros
Copa Venezuela: 2011

Vitória de Guimarães
Taça de Portugal: 2012–13

Individual
Segunda División Player of the Month: February 2019

References

External links

1993 births
Living people
Venezuelan footballers
People from Tucupita
Association football forwards
Venezuelan Primera División players
A.C.C.D. Mineros de Guayana players
La Liga players
Segunda División players
Club Recreativo Granada players
Granada CF footballers
Hércules CF players
SD Huesca footballers
CD Leganés players
Cádiz CF players
Primeira Liga players
Liga Portugal 2 players
Vitória S.C. players
Serie A players
Udinese Calcio players
Venezuelan expatriate footballers
Venezuelan expatriate sportspeople in Spain
Venezuelan expatriate sportspeople in Portugal
Venezuelan expatriate sportspeople in Italy
Expatriate footballers in Spain
Expatriate footballers in Portugal
Expatriate footballers in Italy
Venezuela under-20 international footballers
Venezuela international footballers
2019 Copa América players